Clement Frank Stralka (May 19, 1913 – January 10, 1994) was an American football guard and tackle in the National Football League (NFL) for the Washington Redskins.  He played college football at Georgetown University.  After leaving the NFL, he became a football coach at the United States Merchant Marine Academy in Kings Point, New York.

References

External links
 

1913 births
1994 deaths
American football guards
American football tackles
Georgetown Hoyas football players
Merchant Marine Mariners football coaches
Washington Redskins players
United States Navy personnel of World War II
People from Luzerne County, Pennsylvania
People from Kings Point, New York
Players of American football from Pennsylvania
United States Navy sailors